Austus was a variation of Australian rules football which was played in Australia during World War II between Australians and visiting soldiers from the United States. The name comes from the first four letters of Australia (AUST) and the initials of the United States (US).

Background
One of the earliest suggestions of a hybrid code was by Harry Bromley who visited America in 1915 to promote "national football", a version of Australian football played on American gridiron fields which allowed throwing of the ball. He wished to capitalise on the growing popularity of Gaelic football, Australian football and American football in the States and gained the support of Irish American Athletic Club member James Sullivan to help promote it. However America's entry to the war put an end to the plans.

Sports exhibitions by servicemen from both the Australian and visiting American services were commonplace during World War II as fundraisers, including American football. However, it was not possible for teams from Australia and America to play against each other in either of their national football codes due to the differences in skills: Australians were not adept at long throws of the ball, as was common in American football, and Americans were not adept at kicking, particularly on the run, as was required to play Australian rules football.

To enable football competitions between Australians and Americans, a modified code was proposed. Although sometimes described as a hybrid between the Australian and American codes, creator Ern Cowley described it as "99% Australian rules with the addition of gridiron highlights". The only significant rule change from the Australian game was that the American football-style forward pass was allowed and afforded the same benefits as an Australian rules football kick. Therefore, a ball thrown over a distance of at least ten yards could be marked if caught on the full; and goals could be scored from throws, with the exception that a thrown goal must have been from a distance greater than twenty yards – an arc twenty yards from the goal line was painted on the field to enable this to be judged by umpires. The game was played with an American football rather than an Australian football, because the pointed design of the American ball meant that it could be both thrown and kicked. These rules enabled Americans to participate against Australians at Australian rules football using the ball skills they already possessed from playing American football.

First Matches
The first game of Austus was played on 18 July 1943 at Punt Road Oval between a team of US Servicemen and an Australian Explosives Factory team over two 25-minute halves. The Americans won 8.4 (52) to 5.8 (38). Two weeks later, an Australian team comprising around twelve VFL players comfortably defeated the Americans 17.23 (125) d. 8.1 (49) in a full-length game. Several more games were played as exhibitions in 1943 and 1944. By the end of 1943, both countries' armed forces endorsed the game as a suitable activity for their troops, with the rules later published in official army publications. The US Army noted that the game was more suited to warmer climates than the American game, and was more convenient as it could be played without protective equipment.

The rules are credited to The Sporting Globe sportswriter and former  player Ern Cowley. Cowley and leading American player Private Bill Jost, who was a prodigious throw and captained the American teams, were both presented medals by the Helms Athletic Foundation in 1944 for their services to the short-lived code.

The game all but disappeared after the departure of American soldiers from Australia in 1945. Some consideration was given after the war to sending Australian teams to America to demonstrate the sport, but an absence of willing financial backers meant that the idea quickly fell through. The game has rarely if ever been played since.

References and sources

External links
Newsreel footage of an Austus game

Variations of Australian rules football
Variations of American football
Sports originating in Australia
Hybrid sports